A Night At The Adonis is a 1978 gay pornographic film directed by Jack Deveau and starring Jack Wrangler, Chris Michaels, Big Bill Eld (also called Bill Young), and Mandingo.  A highly plot-driven film, it hails from the "Golden Age" of gay pornography.

Premise
The film tracks Jack Wrangler's evening at the titular Adonis Theatre, a (then) well-known Times Square movie house where sexual activity took place.

Cast
 Jack Wrangler
 Roger
 Chris Michaels
 Big Bill Eld
 Mandingo
 Mark Woodward
 Malo
 Jim Delegatti
 Ken Schneizez
 Muffie Mayer
 Geraldo
 Eartha Hugee
 Koos Chapman
 Lee Foster
 Keith Strickland
 Paul Maul
 Victor Williams
 Todd Travers
 Robert A. Glory

See also

 List of gay porn stars
 List of gay pornographic movie studios

External links
 

1970s pornographic films
1978 films
American pornographic films
Gay pornographic films
1978 LGBT-related films
Films set in New York City
1970s English-language films
1970s American films